SC Wiedenbrück is a German association football club from the city of Rheda-Wiedenbrück, North Rhine-Westphalia. The footballers are part of a sports club of some 1,150 members that also includes departments for dance, gymnastics, and table tennis.

History
Sportclub Wiedenbrück was created through the merger of DJK Wiedenbrück and Westfalia Wiedenbrück in 2000. Following the union the football side took up DJKs place in the sixth tier Berzirksliga, and quickly moved up to the Verbandsliga Westfalen (V). The club slipped to play in the Landesliga in 2005, but recovered the next season, returning to the Verbandsliga where they finished as runners-up in 2007. That finish earned SC promotion to the fourth division Oberliga Westfalen alongside champions SV Schermbeck. Wiedenbrück suffered through a poor season in 2007–08 and were relegated after a 17th-place result. After one season in the Verbandsliga, SC Wiedenbrück were runners-up in the NRW-Liga. In the NRW-Liga the team won the championship and earned promotion to the tier four Regionalliga West, where they played for nine seasons before being relegated in 2019.

Stadium
The SC Wiedenbrück plays its home fixtures in the Jahnstadion, which was improved between 2003 and 2006 to include a seating area and enlarged general admission grandstand.
In 2022 they added a roof to the standing section.

Current squad

Honours
The club's honours:
 NRW-Liga 
 Champions: 2010
 Verbandsliga Westfalen Group 1 (VI) 
 Champions: 2009
 Runners-up: 2007
 Westphalia Cup'
 Winners: 2011

References

External links 
  
 Das deutsche Fußball-Archiv historical German domestic league tables (in German)

Football clubs in Germany
Football clubs in North Rhine-Westphalia
Association football clubs established in 2000
2000 establishments in Germany